Savanna Township is one of twelve townships in Carroll County, Illinois, USA.  As of the 2020 census, its population was 3,432 and it contained 1,919 housing units.

Geography

Cities, towns, villages
 Savanna (vast majority)

Unincorporated towns
 Ayers
(This list is based on USGS data and may include former settlements.)

Cemeteries
The township contains these two cemeteries: Saint Johns and Savanna.

Major highways
  US Route 52
  Illinois Route 64
  Illinois Route 84

Airports and landing strips
 Savanna City Hospital Heliport
 Tri-Township Airport

Rivers
 Mississippi River

Lakes
 Bowens Lake
 Misquakee Lake
 Spring Lake

Landmarks
 Mississippi Palisades State Park (south edge)
 Old Mill Park

Demographics
As of the 2020 census there were 3,432 people, 1,780 households, and 855 families residing in the township. The racial makeup of the township was 88.69% White, 1.66% African American, 0.52% Native American, 0.17% Asian, 0.06% Pacific Islander, 2.97% from other races, and 5.91% from two or more races. Hispanic or Latino of any race were 8.07% of the population.

There were 1,780 households, out of which 18.60% had children under the age of 18 living with them, 40.45% were married couples living together, 6.52% had a female householder with no spouse present, and 51.97% were non-families. 45.70% of all households were made up of individuals, and 21.20% had someone living alone who was 65 years of age or older. The average household size was 1.91 and the average family size was 2.73.

The township's age distribution consisted of 18.8% under the age of 18, 3.6% from 18 to 24, 24.3% from 25 to 44, 27.8% from 45 to 64, and 25.5% who were 65 years of age or older. The median age was 48.5 years. For every 100 females, there were 83.4 males. For every 100 females age 18 and over, there were 86.0 males.

The median income for a household in the township was $32,750, and the median income for a family was $53,205. Males had a median income of $41,230 versus $16,295 for females. The per capita income for the township was $27,342. About 13.6% of families and 13.1% of the population were below the poverty line, including 5.1% of those under age 18 and 15.3% of those age 65 or over.

School districts
 West Carroll Community Unit School District 314

Political districts
 Illinois' 16th congressional district
 State House District 71
 State Senate District 36

References
 
 United States Census Bureau 2007 TIGER/Line Shapefiles
 United States National Atlas

External links
 City-Data.com
 Illinois State Archives
 Carroll County official site

Townships in Carroll County, Illinois
Townships in Illinois